Bicycling the Pacific Coast is a 1984 bicycle touring guide by Vicky Spring and Tom Kirkendall, published by The Mountaineers Books. The book covers a nearly  route from Vancouver, British Columbia to Tijuana, Mexico, following mostly United States Highway 101 and California State Route 1.

It has been called "a classic" and "the Bible for touring cyclists." In its Oregon Coast Bike Route guide, Oregon Department of Transportation noted the book as an "excellent" guide to its  portion of Spring and Kirkendall's route.

Notes

External links
Official website - Mountaineers Books

1984 non-fiction books
American travel books
Bicycle tours
Books about camping
Books about California
Cycling books